Gorla Maggiore is a comune (municipality) in the Province of Varese in the Italian region Lombardy, located about  northwest of Milan and about  southeast of Varese.

Gorla Maggiore borders the following municipalities: Carbonate, Fagnano Olona, Gorla Minore, Locate Varesino, Mozzate, Solbiate Olona.

Since the 1 June 2015 the mayor of the city is Pietro Zappamiglio.

Population history

References

External links
 www.comunegorlamaggiore.it

Cities and towns in Lombardy